The 1966 United States Senate election in Michigan was held on November 7, 1966. Incumbent Republican U.S. Senator Robert P. Griffin, who had been appointed to the seat in May to fill the vacancy left by the death of Patrick V. McNamara, was re-elected to a full term in office. Griffin defeated Democratic former Governor G. Mennen Williams in the regularly scheduled election, as well as the concurrent special election to complete McNamara's unfinished term.

Democratic primary

Candidates
Jerome P. Cavanagh, Mayor of Detroit
G. Mennen Williams, Assistant U.S. Secretary of State for Africa Affairs and former Governor of Michigan (1949–61)

Results

General election

Results

Special election

See also 
 1966 United States Senate elections

References 

Michigan
1966
1966 Michigan elections